Khulekani Madondo (born 20 June 1990 in Pietermaritzburg, KwaZulu-Natal) is a South African football (soccer) midfielder for Premier Soccer League club Baroka.

References

External links

1990 births
Association football midfielders
Living people
Sportspeople from Pietermaritzburg
South African soccer players
Maritzburg United F.C. players
AmaZulu F.C. players
Platinum Stars F.C. players
Baroka F.C. players
South African Premier Division players
National First Division players